A by-election for the United Kingdom parliamentary constituency of Birmingham Erdington was held on 3 March 2022. It was triggered by the death of the Labour Member of Parliament (MP) Jack Dromey on 7 January. The winner was Paulette Hamilton, standing for Labour, who won 55.5% of the votes on a turnout of 27% of the electorate.

This was the first by-election in a parliamentary constituency in Birmingham since the 2004 Birmingham Hodge Hill by-election.

Background and voter registration
Labour has held Birmingham Erdington since the seat was re-established in 1974. Dromey had been the MP for the constituency since 2010, being re-elected in 2015, 2017 and 2019. He died suddenly in his Birmingham flat on the Friday morning of 7 January 2022, according to a family statement. He had spoken in a House of Commons afternoon debate on the UK resettlement scheme for Afghan refugees the day before.

The writ was issued on 31 January. The deadline to register to vote was 00:00 GMT on 15 February, with applications for postal votes due by 17:00 GMT on 16 February.

Candidates
The Labour Party candidate was Paulette Hamilton, who is Birmingham City Council's cabinet member for Health and Social Care. She was selected in a virtual hustings against Ashley Bertie, the former West Midlands deputy police and crime commissioner, receiving 82 votes to Bertie's 32.

The Conservative Party selected Robert Alden, who had contested the seat in the previous four general elections.

Reform UK (formerly the Brexit Party) selected Birmingham postman Jack Brookes.

The Liberal Democrats selected Lee Dargue, who works in the rail sector, occupational health and safety and environmental management.

The Green Party selected local businesswoman Siobhan Harper-Nunes as its candidate.

Michael Lutwyche stood as an independent. Lutwyche is a Justice-4-the-21 campaigner, supporting the victims of the Birmingham pub bombings.

Dave Nellist stood for the Trade Unionist and Socialist Coalition (TUSC). He was the Labour MP for Coventry South East from 1983 to 1992. Nellist received support from the Breakthrough Party, the Northern Independence Party and Left Unity, who joined the TUSC on 20 January 2022 in the PAL - People's Alliance of the Left.

David Bishop was a satirical candidate. He said he was standing for serious policies, such as scrapping HS2 and saving public lavatories, as well as less serious ones, like legalising brothels with a 20% discount for pensioners. This would be the last by election contested by David Bishop before his death in December 2022.

Campaign
Near the end of the campaign, remarks made by Paulette Hamilton in 2015 were uncovered by GB News where she suggested she was torn between a democratic vote and an uprising to enable black people to get what "we really deserve in this country". The comments led to calls from some Conservative MPs for her to be suspended by the Labour Party, who responded saying the remarks were taken out of context.

Results

Previous result

See also
 2022 Birmingham City Council election

References

External links
 Elections and voting. Birmingham City Council website (birmingham.gov.uk).

2022 elections in the United Kingdom
Erdington
2022 Birmingham Erdington
2022 in England
March 2022 events in the United Kingdom